A penumbral lunar eclipse took place on Wednesday, January 30, 1991, the first of four lunar eclipses in 1991.

Visibility

Relations to other lunar eclipses

Eclipses of 1991 
 An annular solar eclipse on January 15.
 A penumbral lunar eclipse on January 30.
 A penumbral lunar eclipse on June 27.
 A total solar eclipse on July 11.
 A penumbral lunar eclipse on July 26.
 A partial lunar eclipse on December 21.

Saros series 
This eclipse is part of Saros cycle series 143.

Lunar year series

Half-Saros cycle
A lunar eclipse will be preceded and followed by solar eclipses by 9 years and 5.5 days (a half saros). This lunar eclipse is related to two partial solar eclipses of Solar Saros 150.

Tzolkinex 
 Preceded: Lunar eclipse of December 19, 1983

 Followed: Lunar eclipse of March 13, 1998

See also 
List of lunar eclipses
List of 20th-century lunar eclipses

Notes

External links 
 

1991-01
1991 in science
January 1991 events